Alf Göran Högosta (born April 15, 1954 in Äppelbo, Sweden) is a Swedish former professional ice hockey goaltender.

Högosta played one game for the New York Islanders in 1977-78 and in 21 games with the Quebec Nordiques in 1979-80. In Sweden he played for Leksands IF and Västra Frölunda HC.

He represented Sweden at the 1976 Canada Cup.

External links 

1954 births
Frölunda HC players
Leksands IF players
Living people
New York Islanders players
People from Vansbro Municipality
Quebec Nordiques players
Swedish ice hockey goaltenders
Undrafted National Hockey League players
Sportspeople from Dalarna County